Cold Day in Hell is a mixtape by American rapper Freddie Gibbs. It was released on October 31, 2011. It was recorded between 2009 and 2011 with stops and assistance by Young Jeezy's Corporate Thugz. The mixtape features guest appearances from Young Jeezy himself, alongside other artists such as Dom Kennedy, Freeway, Juicy J, Sly Polaroid, Alley Boy, 2 Chainz and Scrilla, among others.

Track listing

References

2011 EPs
Freddie Gibbs albums
Albums produced by Big K.R.I.T.
Albums produced by Cardo
Albums produced by J.U.S.T.I.C.E. League
Albums produced by Mike Will Made It